Maidla Parish was an Estonian municipality located in Ida-Viru County.

In October 2013, Maidla Parish along with the town of Püssi were merged into Lüganuse Parish, and therefore ceased to exist as sovereign municipalities.

In 2004 Maidla Parish had a population of 772 and an area of 332.3 km².

Villages 
In 2013, Maidla Parish had 27 villages: Aidu, Aidu-Liiva, Aidu-Nõmme, Aidu-Sooküla, Aruküla, Arupäälse, Aruvälja, Hirmuse, Koolma, Kulja, Lipu, Lümatu, Maidla, Mehide, Oandu, Ojamaa, Piilse, Rebu, Rääsa, Salaküla, Savala, Sirtsi, Soonurme, Tarumaa, Uniküla, Veneoja and Virunurme.

References

External links
 

Former municipalities of Estonia
Geography of Ida-Viru County